The Bethel Woods Center for the Arts is an amphitheatre, performing arts center and museum located at the site of the 1969 Woodstock Music & Art Fair in Bethel, New York. Concerts run June through September and feature many types of music genres.

History
In 1996, Alan Gerry, a longtime Liberty, New York resident and founder of Cablevision Industries, created a not-for-profit organization named the Gerry Foundation with the intent of revitalizing the economy of Sullivan County, which had faced severe hardships following the collapse of the Catskill's Borscht Belt tourism industry. That same year, the Foundation purchased the original  Woodstock festival field and hundreds of acres surrounding it, with eventual plans for an arts center.

In 1998, the Foundation hosted a three-day festival on the site named "Day in the Garden", and in 1999 hosted a four-day celebration of the 30th anniversary of the original Woodstock.

Planning for the arts center, designed by architectural firm DLR Group, began in 2002, and construction on the $150 million project started two years later. The amphitheatre opened on July 4, 2006, with a performance by the New York Philharmonic. On August 13, 2006, Crosby, Stills, Nash & Young performed before 16,000 fans at the new center, 37 years after their historic performance at Woodstock. For their encore, they performed the song "Woodstock". 

The on-site museum, exploring the 1969 Woodstock festival and the culture of the 1960s, opened in June 2008.

In 2012, Bethel Woods was spun off from the Gerry Foundation into its own 501(c)(3) public nonprofit. The next year, the site opened a conservatory dedicated to expanding youth and teen education programs.

Venues

Bethel Woods features a  main stage called The Pavilion, with 4,500 covered seats and a natural sloping lawn that can accommodate up to 10,500 people. The outdoor Terrace Stage, near the museum, has space for up to 1,000 people, and the Woodstock Festival Field can accommodate up to 30,000 people. Other venues at the center include 440-seat indoor Event Gallery, the 132-seat Museum Theatre, The Market Sheds event space, and two classrooms.

The Museum at Bethel Woods

The Museum at Bethel Woods opened in June 2006. It aims to explore the unique experience of the 1969 Woodstock Music & Art Fair and its significance as a culminating event of a decade of radical cultural transformation, along with the continuing legacies of both the 1960s and Woodstock.

Permanent exhibits include The Sixties, The Woodstock Festival, Three Days of Peace and Music, and Impact of Woodstock & The Sixties, each featuring film and interactive displays, text panels, and collections of artifacts.

In addition to information about the music festival, which is about two-thirds of the museum's scope, the museum offers exhibits, personal stories and a multimedia experience about various aspects of the 1960s, including music, fashion and political protest. It focuses on issues such as the baby boom, Cold War, Vietnam War, Civil Rights Movement, and the assassinations and riots that occurred during the decade, all of which contribute to the context of Woodstock. The  museum includes a 132-seat high-definition theater and a  gallery, as well as classrooms, a cafe, a museum shop, and a patio. A special exhibit gallery opened in 2009.

The Museum, and Bethel Woods Museum Development Group CEO Michael Egan, were the recipients of a 2010 Thea Award for excellence in themed entertainment.

Funding controversy
$1 million in federal funding earmarked for The Museum by the U.S. Senate in June 2007 was criticized after it was revealed the museum founder, Alan Gerry, then donated almost $30,000 to New York Senators Hillary Clinton and Charles Schumer, who had helped to secure the funding. Clinton did not speak during the debate on the project, but Schumer strongly defended the Bethel project as a boon for an economically struggling county.

The funding was rescinded in October 2007 following criticism from Republicans led by John McCain, although it did not affect the museum's scheduled opening nor the more than $15 million in state funding.

Economic impact 
Bethel Woods offers programs nine months out of the year. Opening the center helped revive tourism, which suffered in the region following the closure of many resorts following the decline of the Borscht Belt. Sullivan County has struggled with the legacy of Woodstock, and officials hoped the museum would help with reconciliation. The opening of the performing arts center in 2006, led to increased development in Bethel, along the Route 17B corridor, and in nearby Kauneonga Lake (formerly North White Lake), and is one of the county's larger economic development programs, despite the initial controversy surrounding some of its funding. A Bethel Woods report from 2018 indicated that $560.82 million of spending has been generated in New York. With 2.9 million visitors since 2006 and 214,405 visitors in 2018, an equivalent of 172 full-time jobs exist as a result, which includes direct wages of $5.1 million from Bethel Woods in Sullivan County.

See also
List of contemporary amphitheatres

References

External links
 Bethel Woods Center for the Arts Website
 The Museum at Bethel Woods
 Sullivan County Visitor's Association homepage
 Sullivan County Chamber of Commerce homepage

Performing arts centers in New York (state)
New York (state) culture
Music venues in New York (state)
Catskills
Museums in Sullivan County, New York
History museums in New York (state)
Music museums in New York (state)
Museums established in 2008
Hippie movement
Tourist attractions in Sullivan County, New York
2008 establishments in New York (state)